Fjodor Xhafa (born 8 March 1976) is an Albanian former footballer who played as a striker, and a current coach.

Club career
Xhafa was registered as Elbasani player for the 2007–08 season.

On 26 July 2010, Xhafa, at 33 years old, agreed personal terms and joined Bylis Ballsh for a third time.

During the summer of 2013, Xhafa decided to end his football playing career after 20 years as a professional footballer, starting the coaching career as the assistant manager of Bylis Ballsh.

International career

On 13 March 2002, Xhafa played his first and last match with Albania national team, substituting the fellow debutant Dritan Babamusta in the 56th minute in the 4–0 away loss at Qualcomm Stadium against Mexico.

Honours

Club

Dinamo Tirana
Albanian Superliga: 2001–02

Tirana
Albanian Superliga: 2002–03, 2003–04, 2004–05
Albanian Cup: 2005–06

References

External links

1977 births
Living people
Footballers from Vlorë
Albanian footballers
Association football forwards
Albania international footballers
Albania under-21 international footballers
Flamurtari Vlorë players
KF Bylis Ballsh players
FK Dinamo Tirana players
R.A.E.C. Mons players
KF Tirana players
KF Elbasani players
Kategoria Superiore players
Kategoria e Parë players
Albanian expatriate footballers
Expatriate footballers in Belgium
Albanian expatriate sportspeople in Belgium